
Gmina Gryfino is an urban-rural gmina (administrative district) in Gryfino County, West Pomeranian Voivodeship, in north-western Poland, on the German border.

The gmina contains parts of the protected areas of Szczecin Landscape Park and Lower Odra Valley Landscape Park.

Villages
Apart from the town of Gryfino, Gmina Gryfino contains the villages and settlements of Bartkowo, Borzym, Chlebowo, Chwarstnica, Ciosna, Czepino, Daleszewo, Dębce, Dołgie, Drzenin, Gajki, Gardno, Krajnik, Krzypnica, Łubnica, Mielenko Gryfińskie, Nowe Brynki, Nowe Czarnowo, Osuch, Parsówek, Pastuszka, Pniewo, Raczki, Radziszewo, Skrzynice, Sobiemyśl, Sobieradz, Śremsko, Stare Brynki, Steklinko, Steklno, Szczawno, Wełtyń, Wirów, Wirówek, Włodkowice, Wysoka Gryfińska, Żabnica, Zaborze, Żórawie and Żórawki.

Neighbouring gminas
Gmina Gryfino is bordered by the city of Szczecin and by the gminas of Banie, Bielice, Kołbaskowo, Stare Czarnowo and Widuchowa. It also borders Germany.

Industry 
 Dolna Odra Power Station

References
Polish official population figures 2006

Gryfino
Gryfino County